Renan Victor da Silva (born 19 May 2002), simply known as Renan, is a Brazilian footballer who plays for Shabab Al Ahli mainly as central defender, he can also play as a left back.

Accident 
On July 22nd 2022, a friday morning, on 6:40 am Renan got involved on a car accident in Bragança Paulista resulting in the death of a 38 year old man. Renan admitted being drunk and the police found out that he was driving without a driver's licenses. Upon the incident Red Bull Bragantino immediately terminated his contract. The following day, he left prison after paying a bail.

Career statistics

Honours

Club
Palmeiras
Copa Libertadores: 2020, 2021
Copa do Brasil: 2020
Recopa Sudamericana: 2022
Campeonato Paulista: 2022

International
Brazil U17
FIFA U-17 World Cup: 2019

Individual
Campeonato Paulista Breakthrough Player: 2021

References

2002 births
Living people
Footballers from São Paulo (state)
Brazilian footballers
Brazil youth international footballers
Association football defenders
Sociedade Esportiva Palmeiras players
Red Bull Bragantino players
Shabab Al-Ahli Club players
Campeonato Brasileiro Série A players